Forty Mile is a rural locality in the Shire of Mareeba, Queensland, Australia.

Geography
The Lynd River rises in the locality and forms part of the north-west boundary. Two tributaries of the Tate River, the Sandy Tate River and the Rocky Tate River, also rise here. The Forty Mile Scrub National Park is in the south-east corner of the locality.

Road infrastructure
Ootann Road crosses the northern end from west to east.

References 

Shire of Mareeba
Localities in Queensland